The ninth season of The Real Housewives of Atlanta, an American reality television series, is broadcast on Bravo. It aired on November 6, 2016 until May 14, 2017 and was primarily filmed in Atlanta, Georgia. Its executive producers are Steven Weinstock, Glenda Hersh, Lauren Eskelin, Lorraine Haughton-Lawson, Carlos King, Anne Swan, Anthony Sylvester and Andy Cohen.

The Real Housewives of Atlanta focuses on the lives of Shereé Whitfield, Kandi Burruss, Cynthia Bailey, Phaedra Parks, Kenya Moore and Porsha Williams.

This season marked the final appearance of Phaedra Parks.

Production and crew
The Real Housewives of Atlanta was renewed for a ninth season in April, 2016. On June 10, 2016, Kandi Burruss revealed that filming had begun by posting a photo through her newborn son's Instagram account. The trailer, official cast and premiere date were announced on September 28, 2016.

The season premiere "House of Shade and Dust" debuted on November 6, 2016.
Steven Weinstock, Glenda Hersh, Lauren Eskelin, Lorraine Haughton-Lawson, Carlos King, Anne Swan, and Anthony Sylvester 
alongside Andy Cohen are recognized as the series' executive producers; it is produced and distributed by True Entertainment, an American subsidiary of the Dutch corporation Endemol.

Cast and synopsis
Five of the six wives featured on the eighth season returned for the ninth installment. Season 9 sees the departure of actress and one-season star, Kim Fields. During her time on Dancing with the Stars, Fields revealed that she would be departing the series. With the departure of Fields, season 9 sees the return of Shereè Whitfield in a full-time capacity. Whitfield previously appeared in a recurring capacity during season 8 and as a full-time cast member from season 1 through 4. In June, 2016, Prior to the official cast announcement, former cast member NeNe Leakes revealed she would be returning to season 9 in some capacity however in September 2016, Leakes later revealed that she had not been invited back or filmed any scenes. In the trailer for season 9 it is revealed that former housewives Kim Zolciak-Biermann and Lisa Wu would make a guest appearance in the season finale. Marlo Hampton and Shamea Morton, would make guest appearances. Lena Danielle Chenier also made numerous guest appearances

The season begins with Kenya Moore and Shereé Whitfield both continuing to work on their unfinished homes, Moore Manor and Chateau Shereé. With Phaedra Parks' husband, Apollo Nida, still serving his sentence in prison she continues on her journey of filing for divorce. Looking forward to the finalization of her divorce, Parks and fellow housewife Porsha Willams ponder on the idea of possibly dating. While Parks ponders a new relationship, Cynthia Bailey's marriage to Peter "Patricia" Thomas breaks down, leaving some hard decisions to be made. Kandi Burruss and her husband Todd Tucker face the challenges of parenting their newborn, Ace. Williams faces some self-reflection as she is forced to look in the mirror. As Moore reaches closer to finishing her home, she invites some of the ladies over to celebrate. At the party, Whitfield is left shocked by what she sees.

 during her appearance at the reunion, Morton sits at the end of the right couch next to Whitfield.

Episodes

References

External links

2016 American television seasons
2017 American television seasons
Atlanta (season 9)